Deraz Mahalleh (also Romanized as Derāz Maḩalleh) is a village in Kharajgil Rural District, Asalem District, Talesh County, Gilan Province, Iran. At the 2006 census, its population was 544, in 129 families.

References 

Populated places in Talesh County